Norfield is an unincorporated community in Lincoln County, Mississippi, United States.

History
The community was founded in 1886 as a sawmill town. Norfield's name is a portmanteau of the surnames of Frederick Norwood and John S. Butterfield, who founded the Norwood-Butterfield Lumber Company. The sawmill in Norfield was the first sawmill in the southern United States to use a bandsaw to cut yellow pine. In 1900, the community had a population of 347 and was estimated to have a population of 700 six years later. By 1930, the community had the second-largest population in Lincoln County and had a theater, hotel, and golf course.

Norfield is located on the Canadian National Railway. The Norwood-Butterfield Company operated the Natchez, Columbia & Mobile Railroad, a standard gauge logging railroad that ran 30 miles east from Norfield. The railroad operated six locomotives.

A post office operated under the name Norfield from 1891 to 1953.

Notable people
 Little Brother Montgomery, blues pianist, lived in Norfield as a young man

Gallery

Notes

Unincorporated communities in Lincoln County, Mississippi
Unincorporated communities in Mississippi